You and Me and Uncle Bob is a 1993 Australian television film directed by Alister Smart. The screenplay concerns two children (portrayed by Brooke Anderson and David Kaff) who play cupid to an unlikely older couple: a chorus girl (portrayed by Melissa Jaffer) and an unemployed butcher (portrayed by Martin Vaughan).

References

External links

1993 television films
1993 films
Australian television films
1990s English-language films